Kristian Skjødt Kjærgaard (born 18 September 1980) is a Danish sailor. He competed in the men's 470 event at the 2004 Summer Olympics.

References

External links
 
 

1980 births
Living people
Danish male sailors (sport)
Olympic sailors of Denmark
Sailors at the 2004 Summer Olympics – 470
Place of birth missing (living people)